Paul de Graffenried (10 June 1900 – 17 November 1945) was a Swiss fencer. He competed at the 1928, 1932 and 1936 Summer Olympics.

References

External links
 

1900 births
1945 deaths
Swiss male fencers
Olympic fencers of Switzerland
Fencers at the 1928 Summer Olympics
Fencers at the 1932 Summer Olympics
Fencers at the 1936 Summer Olympics
Paul